Boyd Daniel Clack (born 7 March 1951) is a Canadian-born Welsh writer, actor, and musician. He was born in Vancouver, British Columbia, Canada to Welsh parents. At a young age, he emigrated with his family to Wales, where he grew up in Tonyrefail, where his family were originally from.

His acting credits include Twin Town, High Hopes, and Satellite City, the latter two of which he also co-wrote. He has also released the first part of his autobiography. Kisses Sweeter than Wine, and two music albums, Welsh Bitter and Labourer of Love .

Clack is a supporter of Welsh independence and attended a pro-independence rally in Merthyr Tydfil in September 2019, organised by AUOB Cymru. "I have always favoured Welsh Independence because every country should be independent," he said. "The opposite of independent after all is dependent and to be dependent on anyone or an organisation where that dependence isn’t based on love, kindness and genuine care is demeaning." At the 2019 general election, Clack stood as Plaid Cymru's candidate for the Cardiff West constituency.

Filmography

References

External links
 

1951 births
Canadian emigrants to Wales
Canadian people of Welsh descent
Living people
Male actors from Vancouver
Musicians from Vancouver
People from Tonyrefail
20th-century Welsh musicians
Welsh writers
Writers from Vancouver